"Beyond the Veil" is the first single from Lindsey Stirling's second studio album Shatter Me. The song was released digitally on March 24, 2014, and the official YouTube video was released a day later. The video accumulated half a million views in its first day. The song topped the Billboard Classical Digital Songs chart for the first four weeks. This single is the first in the track list of the twelve songs that make up her second studio album and, according to Stirling, it was the first song she composed on her album. The behind-the-scenes video was released a week later, on March 31, where Stirling explained the message of the song and its composition.

Charts

References

2014 singles
2014 songs
Lindsey Stirling songs
Songs written by Lindsey Stirling